The European Journal of Criminology is a peer-reviewed academic journal covering the field of criminology. The editor-in-chief is Paul Knepper (Sheffield University). It was established in 2004 and is published by SAGE Publications on behalf of the European Society of Criminology.

An article that was scheduled for publication in the journal and widely reported and discussed in Danish media was later retracted and never appeared in the journal.

Abstracting and indexing 
The journal is abstracted and indexed in Scopus and the Social Sciences Citation Index. According to the Journal Citation Reports, its 2013 impact factor is 1.141, ranking it 24 out of 52 journals in the category "Criminology & Penology".

References

External links 

 
 European Society of Criminology

SAGE Publishing academic journals
English-language journals
Criminology journals
Publications established in 2004
Bimonthly journals
Academic journals associated with international learned and professional societies of Europe